Mughlani Begum also known as Murad Begum, ruled Punjab from Lahore for a few months in 1753. She was known for playing her friends and foes against each other for her personal gains. She was the wife of Moin-ul-Mulk (Mir Mannu), who was Governor of the Subah of Lahore from 1748 to 1753, and who had endeared himself to Ahmed Shah Abdali, the King of Afghanistan.

Rise to power
In November 1753, Moin-ul-Mulk was killed in a horse accident and his infant son was appointed the Governor of Punjab by the Mughal Emperor Ahmad Shah Bahadur. Mughlani Begum became regent to the infant Governor and garnered all the powers in her hands. She however neglected the affairs of the state and led an amoral life, having illicit affairs with many men. Incensed by this, the Mughal officers threw her out and appointed Mirza Khan in her place. Mughlani sent her uncle to Abdali requesting for help to get back her power. Abdali dispatched a small army to Lahore, captured Mirza Khan, and restored the powers to Mughlani. But soon after, her son died and she lost her powers again.

Mughlani now got into a power struggle with her uncle and lost, because the latter had the backing of Abdali's men. Piqued by this, Mughlani sought the help of Imad-ul-mulk, who was the Mughal Wazir in Delhi, and also engaged to Mughlani's daughter Umda Begum. Imad agreed to help by sending his troops, but backed out when he got wind of Mughlani's many illicit liaisons, for he felt this would be a disgrace to his family. He secretly sent a contingent of soldiers to Lahore, who encircled Mughlani's palace and forcibly took her away to Sirhind.

Vowing revenge, Mughlani now started making overtures to Ahmed Shah Abdali, promising him a treasure trove in the ancestral palace of her father-n-law, the late Wazir Qamruddin Khan. There were others who conspired against Imad-ul-mulk and invited Abdali to invade Delhi. Abdali picked up the bait and decided to invade Delhi. When the news of the impending invasion reached Imad, he had neither an army nor allies willing to fight for him. In desperation he sought peace and sent Mughlani, most ironically, as his envoy to Abdali to stop the invasion. Mughlani tried to 'convince' Abdali to turn back, but he refused since he was already on the doorstep of Delhi.

Mughlani sent a secret note to Imad, asking him to flee to a safe place, if he did not have the stomach to fight Abdali. Imad finally surrendered and was stripped of all his powers and wealth. Abdali systematically plundered the city of Delhi, Mughlani pointing out the wealthy people, for which she was rewarded with titles and land.
 
When Abdali retreated to Afghanistan with his loot, the estates were taken away from Mughlani. She was offered a pension, which she haughtily refused and lived in Lahore in poverty.

In popular culture 

Indian film director Surjit Singh Sethi made Mughlani Begum, a 1979 Punjabi-language film about the Begum and Mir Mannu, starring Preet Kanwal in the titular role.

References

Date of birth unknown
Date of death unknown
Punjabi culture
Punjabi women
18th-century Indian women politicians
18th-century women rulers